Soyuz 34 (Union 34) was a 1979 Soviet uncrewed space flight to the Salyut 6 space station. It was sent to supply the resident crew a reliable return vehicle after the previous flight, Soyuz 33, suffered an engine failure.

Mission control decided to re-design the engine used on Soyuz craft as a result of the Soyuz 33 failure, and to return the Soyuz 32 craft which transported Vladimir Lyakhov and Valery Ryumin to the space station to Earth uncrewed as it had the same suspect engine as Soyuz 33. Soyuz 34 successfully returned the crew to earth 73 days after launching.

Crew

Mission parameters
Mass: 
Perigee: 
Apogee: 
Inclination: 51.62°
Period: 88.91 minutes

Mission highlights

Soyuz 34 had been intended to have been launched around 6 June 1979 with a two-man Hungarian/Soviet crew. That crew would have presumably returned in Soyuz 33 which had been planned to be docked at the Salyut 6 space station. Suspicions this was originally to be a Hungarian/Soviet flight were confirmed in 1980 when press releases for an upcoming joint mission were still dated June 1979.

However, the engine failure during Soyuz 33's flight in April necessitated a shuffling of planned missions. Because the engine used in that flight was the same model already docked at the space station on Soyuz 32 and the resident crew of Vladimir Lyakhov and Valery Ryumin needed a reliable craft to return to Earth in, it was decided that the engine needed to be modified and a fresh return vehicle sent to the station - vacant.

Soyuz 34 was launched uncrewed on 6 June, and docked at the aft port of the space station on 9 June. The flight itself was a test of the new engine and its success meant the crew had a reliable return craft. Since the craft was uncrewed, some biological samples for experiments were included on the flight.

Soyuz 32 was loaded with 130 kg of replaced instruments, processed materials, exposed film and other items with a total weight equal to that of the two cosmonauts. On 13 June, it undocked and returned to Earth uncrewed 295 km northwest of Dzhezkazgan. The craft was found to be in good condition. The next day, the crew redocked Soyuz 34 at the forward port to clear the aft port for Progress 7, a supply tanker.

On 19 August, the resident crew returned to earth in Soyuz 34, establishing a new space-endurance record of 175 days, surpassing the 139-day mission by the Soyuz 29 crew in 1978.

Legacy
Years later, a similar scenario of crew return was required in 2022. As Soyuz MS-22, due a coolant leak in external radiator, was unable to perform crew return, it returned uncrewed with cargo, instead of crew, like Soyuz 32 and Soyuz MS-23 was launched unmanned with cargo like Soyuz 34 as a replacement, to return the MS-22 crew.

See also
Soyuz MS-22
Soyuz MS-23

References

Crewed Soyuz missions
1979 in the Soviet Union
Spacecraft launched in 1979
Spacecraft which reentered in 1979
Spacecraft launched by Soyuz-U rockets